Milton Jackson (October 16, 1943 – August 23, 2005) was an American football coach for 26 seasons. He had different coaching positions for the California Golden Bears, Oregon Ducks, UCLA Bruins, San Francisco 49ers, Buffalo Bills, Philadelphia Eagles, Houston Oilers, Indianapolis Colts, Los Angeles Rams, Atlanta Falcons, New York Giants, Seattle Seahawks, and Baltimore Ravens. Also, he was drafted in the 7th round (170), by the San Francisco 49ers but did not play for them. Instead, he played for the San Jose Apaches, and Sacramento Capitols.

Early life
Jackson was born on October 16, 1943. He attended Grant Union High School in Sacramento, California

College career
Jackson played college football at the University of Tulsa.

Professional playing career

San Francisco 49ers
Jackson was drafted in the seventh round of the 1967 NFL/AFL draft with the 170th overall pick by the San Francisco 49ers. He did not play for them.

San Jose Apaches
In 1967, Jackson played for the San Jose Apaches. He played punt returner and cornerback. On defense he had 5 interceptions for 82 yards and a touchdown. On punt returns he had 17 returns for 144 yards. He also scored two touchdowns.

Sacramento Capitols
In 1968, Jackson played for the Sacramento Capitols. He wore number 36 and played safety. They finished the season with a 5–7 record.

In 1969, he played receiver and cornerback. He had 10 catches for 112 yards on offense, and 4 interceptions for 22 yards on defense. The Capitols lost in the Pacific Division Playoff to the Las Vegas Cowboys. 1969 was his last season.

Coaching career

California Golden Bears
In 1975, Jackson got his first coaching job. He became the Linebackers coach for the California Golden Bears. He would spend 1975 to 1976 at California. The Golden Bears were named Pacific-8 Conference Champions that season. Two of the Linebackers that he coached were drafted in the NFL after the 1976 season.(Jeff Barnes and Phil Heck)

Oregon Ducks
In 1977, he was the defensive backfield coach for the Oregon Ducks. They finished with a 2–9 record.

In 1978 they went 2–9 for the second season.

UCLA Bruins
He became the UCLA Bruins Tight Ends and Tackles coach for the 1979 season. They had a 5–6 record.

San Francisco 49ers
His first NFL coaching job came as the wide receivers and special teams coach of the San Francisco 49ers. In 1980 the 49ers recorded a 6–10 record.

Jackson was the wide receivers coach again in 1981, as the 49ers finished with a 13–3 record. In the conference championship, against the Dallas Cowboys, wide receiver Dwight Clark made a game-winning catch in the back of the end zone to get the San Francisco 49ers to the Super Bowl. The play would be known as The Catch. The 49ers would then go on to win the Super Bowl against the Cincinnati Bengals.

Buffalo Bills
After the 1982 season with the 49ers, he was named the wide receivers coach of the Buffalo Bills. They finished with a 8–8 record in 1983. He would coach them from 1983 to 1984 before going to the Philadelphia Eagles.

Philadelphia Eagles
He became the Philadelphia Eagles running backs coach in 1985. The Eagles had a 7–9 record. Running back Earnest Jackson rushed for 1028 yards that season.

Houston Oilers
He only coached one season with the Eagles before becoming the wide receivers coach of the Houston Oilers. Two receivers had 1000-yard seasons that year, Ernest Givins and Drew Hill. The Oilers had a 7–9 record in 1986.

He remained coach in 1987. They had a 9–6 record and made the playoffs.

His last season as the Oilers receivers coach was in 1988. The Oilers had a 10–6 record and made the playoffs. They lost to the Buffalo Bills in the divisional round.

Indianapolis Colts
He became the Indianapolis Colts receivers coach in 1989.

In 1990 the Colts had a 7–9 record. One receiver he coached made the pro bowl.

In 1991, he was promoted to become the Colts Offensive Coordinator. This was the highest position he held. The Colts had 1–15 record while he was coordinator and Jackson was fired following the season.

Los Angeles Rams
In 1992 he was the Los Angeles Rams wide receivers coach. The Rams were his sixth team in the NFL.

His last season with the Rams came in 1993, were they had a 5–11 record.

Atlanta Falcons
In 1994, he became receivers coach of the Atlanta Falcons. Two receivers he coached had 1000-yard seasons, Terrance Mathis and Andre Rison.

In 1995, with the Falcons, they recorded a 9–7 record but missed the playoffs. Three receivers he coached had 1000-yard seasons in 1995.

In 1996, he became the assistant head coach for the Falcons.

New York Giants
He became the New York Giants wide receivers coach in 1997. They had a 10-5-1 record. He only coached one season with the Giants.

Seattle Seahawks
He coached the Seattle Seahawks wide receivers in 1998.

Baltimore Ravens
1999 was his 25th year of coaching. He was a member of the Baltimore Ravens, serving as their receivers coach.

2000 was his 26th and final season as a coach. The Ravens recorded a 12–4 record and made the playoffs. They went on and won Super Bowl XXXV. It was 20 seasons after Jackson had won Super Bowl XVI. He retired following the season

Later life
He died on August 23, 2005 from a heart attack. He was 61 at the time of his death.

References

1943 births
2005 deaths
American football cornerbacks
American football return specialists
American football safeties
American football wide receivers
Atlanta Falcons coaches
Baltimore Ravens coaches
Buffalo Bills coaches
California Golden Bears football coaches
Coaches of American football from California
Continental Football League players
Houston Oilers coaches
Indianapolis Colts coaches
Los Angeles Rams coaches
New York Giants coaches
Philadelphia Eagles coaches
Players of American football from Sacramento, California
San Francisco 49ers coaches
San Francisco 49ers players
Tulsa Golden Hurricane football players
UCLA Bruins football coaches